Ama is a 2021 Spanish drama film directed by Júlia de Paz Solvas which stars Tamara Casellas, also featuring Leire Marín, Estefanía de los Santos and Ana Turpin.

Plot 
The plot, a deconstruction of the idea of idyllic motherhood, follows Pepa, an irresponsible and foul-mouthed mother of a six-year-old daughter, Leila.

Cast

Production 
The screenplay was penned by Júlia de Paz Solvas alongside Nuria Dunjó, adapting to a feature film format the short film of the same name made by Júlia de Paz Solvas. The film was produced by La Dalia Films alongside Ama Movie AIE. Filming lasted from March to June 2020, with an hiatus caused by the COVID-19 disruption. Sandra Roca took over cinematography duties whereas Oriol Milán was responsible for film editing and Martín Sorozábal for the music. Shooting locations included , Alicante, Benidorm, L'Alfàs del Pi and Seville.

Release 
Ama was presented on 4 June 2021 at the 24th Málaga Spanish Film Festival (FMCE), screened as part of the festival's official selection. Distributed by Filmax, it was theatrically released in Spain on 16 July 2021.

Reception 
Reviewing for Fotogramas, Beatriz Martínez rated the film with 4 out of 5 stars, highlighting the superlative performance by Casellas.

Sergio F. Pinilla of Cinemanía gave the film 3.5 out of 5 stars, describing it as an uncomfortable female portrait.

Sergi Sánchez of La Razón gave it 4 out of 5 stars, praising the Casellas' performance and the rigour behind the proposal.

Accolades 

|-
| align = "center" rowspan = "2" | 2021 || 24th Málaga Spanish Film Festival || Silver Biznaga for Best Actress || Tamara Casellas ||  || 
|-
| 4th Berlanga Awards || Best Actress || Tamara Casellas ||  || align = "center" | 
|-s
| align = "center" rowspan = "5" | 2022 || 9th Feroz Awards || Best Actress || Tamara Casellas ||  || 
|-
| rowspan = "2" | 77th CEC Medals || Best New Actress || Tamara Casellas ||  || rowspan = "2" | 
|-
| Best Adapted Screenplay || Nuria Dunjó, Júlia de Paz || 
|-
| 36th Goya Awards || Best Adapted Screenplay || Júlia de Paz Solvas, Núria Dunjó López ||  || 
|-
|-
| 66th Sant Jordi Awards || Best Spanish Actress || Tamara Casellas ||  || 
|}

See also 
 List of Spanish films of 2021

References

External links 
 Ama at ICAA's Catálogo de Cinespañol

2021 films
Spanish drama films
2021 drama films
Films shot in the province of Seville
Films shot in the province of Alicante
2020s Spanish-language films
2020s Spanish films
Films about mother–daughter relationships